Tsukamurella soli is a Gram-positive and rod-shaped bacterium from the genus of Tsukamurella which has been isolated from forest soil from the Hallasan mountain on the Jeju island in Korea.

References

External links
Type strain of Tsukamurella soli at BacDive -  the Bacterial Diversity Metadatabase	

Mycobacteriales
Bacteria described in 2010